LA Lloyd (born Lloyd Max Hocutt, Jr in Raleigh, North Carolina, United States), is a nationally syndicated radio host for the LA Lloyd Rock 30 and former program director for the San Antonio rock station, KISS-FM. He was named Program Director for the Austin, TX 93.7 KLBJ-FM December 7, 2012.  Lloyd began his radio career at WKZQ-FM in Myrtle Beach, SC in 1984 after graduating from Western Carolina University with a Bachelor of Arts in Radio/TV/Film.

Rock 30 
Hocutt is the host of a nationally syndicated radio program called the LA Lloyd Rock 30. The weekly show is a three-hour countdown of modern rock hits. Each week the show is co-hosted by a different rock act, which is generally either an up-and-coming band or an artist that is currently topping the charts. The show debuted July 4, 2000 with Kid Rock as its first co-host.

Affiliates: (Times based on station's local time zone)

Rock 30 Countdown charts

Weekly Rock 30 archives

External links 
 LA Lloyd's Rock 30 Official Website

Year of birth missing (living people)
Living people
People from San Antonio
People from Raleigh, North Carolina
American radio personalities